Larry Edward Turner, Jr  (born March 8, 1982) was a center for the St. Louis Rams and Cincinnati Bengals of the NFL. He attended Eastern Kentucky University, before being drafted by the St. Louis Rams.

High school years
Turner attended Wayne High School (Huber Heights, Ohio) and won three varsity letters in football, and one in wrestling. In football, as a senior, he won All-League honors, All-Area honors, and was an All-Southwest District honoree. Turner graduated from Wayne High School in 2000.

Professional career
At his pro day at Eastern Kentucky, Turner ran a 5.23 40-yard dash and measured 6-1¼ and 295 pounds.

St. Louis Rams
Turner was drafted by the St. Louis Rams in the 7th round (238th overall) of the 2004 NFL Draft. He played for the Rams for three seasons, playing in 14 games as a rookie, making one start.

Coaching career
After he was released by the Rams, he coached offensive line for the Springboro (Ohio) High School Panthers from 2007-2009. For the 2011 season he was a graduate assistant football coach at Eastern Kentucky University.

References

1982 births
American football offensive guards
Players of American football from Dayton, Ohio
St. Louis Rams players
Eastern Kentucky Colonels football players
People from Huber Heights, Ohio
Living people